Alamzey Stadium  is a football stadium in Burao, Somaliland. It has been the home stadium of the Togdheer Regional Team since 2011.

It is the largest stadium in Burao and the third largest in Somaliland.

See also
Hargeisa Stadium
Ministry of Youth and Sports (Somaliland)
List of stadiums in Africa
Somaliland national football team

References

Stadiums in Somaliland
Togdheer